Freddy  is an animated weatherman. The short animated series covers 20 different weather conditions, complete with sound effects. It is currently shown in Hong Kong on the TVB television channel during the weather report. Freddy's purpose is to show the next day's predicted weather.

Appearance
Freddy wears a yellow suit and has a pink face; his design has not generally changed over the years.

Freddy and the weather
Freddy's actions gives a short forecast of the day's weather:
 In case of extreme heat, he melts;
 In case of lightning, he gets struck by lightning and runs away;
 In case of rain, a rain cloud drifts in and he opens his umbrella;
 In case of heavy rain, the rain fills the screen;
 In case of strong winds, he is blown away;
 In case of cold, he turns to ice;
 In case of fog, he holds up a lantern for light.
 In case of sunny conditions, a flower sprouts, he picks it and walks.

At the same time, there are various sound effects including falling rain, thunder, blowing wind, footsteps, and Freddy's whistling and reactive cries such as "oooh", "aaah" and "awww".

Other markets
Freddy (also known as "Freddy Forecast" or "Freddy the Forecaster") has been shown in 19 television markets in the United States, such as KNOE-TV in Monroe, Louisiana; KTVO TV in Kirksville, Missouri; WJBF in Augusta, Georgia and many other stations. The series also ran in Perth, Australia for many years.

In Shenzhen, China, Shenzhen Television's news bulletin at noon uses a similar character and features Shenzhen's skyline in the background.

Hong Kong (TVB)

In 1993, he became computer animated.

The skyline behind him on TVB's broadcasts is regularly updated to keep abreast of the ever-changing skyline of Hong Kong. It appears as if he is walking on the water surface of Victoria Harbour. As of January 2008, Freddy was upgraded to his third incarnation.

During the 1980s weather reports, in case of fine weather Freddy would pick flowers, which was criticised as an example of destroying public property. After receiving complaints, TVB changed this in the 1990s to him walking and whistling merrily.

References
 Toon Town: the city's homegrown comics, HK Magazine No. 585. Retrieved 29 July 2005.

TVB
Television mascots
Cartoon mascots
Male characters in television
Fictional Hong Kong people